The Lambertz Open by STAWAG is a tennis tournament held in Aachen, Germany since 1991. The event is part of the ''ATP challenger series and is played on indoor carpet courts.

Past finals

Singles

Doubles

External links 
ITF Search

ATP Challenger Tour
Tennis tournaments in Germany
Carpet court tennis tournaments